Plazia is a genus of South American plants in the family Asteraceae.

 Species
 Plazia cheiranthifolia Wedd. - Coquimbo in Colombia
 Plazia conferta Ruiz & Pav. - Junín in Peru
 Plazia daphnoides Wedd. - Bolivia, Peru (Ayacucho), Chile (Tarapacá), Argentina (Jujuy, Mendoza, Salta)
 Plazia robinsonii M.O. Dillon & Sagást - Peru (Huamachuco)
 formerly included
transferred to other genera - Aphyllocladus Gypothamnium Hyalis 
 Plazia acaciifolia J. Koster - Hyalis lancifolia Baker
 Plazia pinnifolia (Phil.) O.Hoffm. - Gypothamnium pinifolium Phil.
 Plazia spartioides (Wedd.) Kuntze - Aphyllocladus spartioides Wedd.

References

Asteraceae genera
Onoserideae
Flora of South America